The Bexar County Courthouse is a historic building in downtown San Antonio, Texas, USA.

The building was designed by architect J. Riely Gordon, and borders Main Plaza, along with such other architectural landmarks as the Cathedral of San Fernando.  The style is Romanesque Revival, and the main material used is red sandstone.  Ground was broken for Gordon's structure on August 4, 1891, and the cornerstone was laid December 17, 1892. After several delays, construction was fully completed in 1896. The building was added to the National Register of Historic Places in 1977.

The Courthouse currently functions as the county seat of Bexar County.

Gallery

See also
Main and Military Plazas Historic District

External links

 Texas Historical Commission - Bexar County Courthouse
 More pictures related to early San Antonio, Texas, at University of Houston Digital Library

Buildings and structures in San Antonio
Romanesque Revival architecture in Texas
County courthouses in Texas
James Riely Gordon buildings
Government buildings completed in 1896
National Register of Historic Places in San Antonio
Courthouses on the National Register of Historic Places in Texas
Recorded Texas Historic Landmarks